The following list includes all of the Canadian Register of Historic Places listings in Thompson-Nicola Regional District, British Columbia.

References 

(references appear in the table above as external links)

Thompson-Nicola Regional District